The Tomb of Sampsigeramus was a mausoleum that formerly stood in the necropolis of Emesa (modern-day Homs, Syria). It is thought to have been built in 78 or 79 CE by a relative of the Emesene dynasty. The remains of the mausoleum were blown up with dynamite by the Ottoman authorities  1911, in order to make room for an oil depot.

According to Andreas Kropp, the monument may be considered to have been a "hybrid creation" and a "fascinating one-off experiment" that resulted from "the cultural choices which the ruling class of Emesa had to face when attempting to reconcile Roman allegiance and Near Eastern tradition."

Location

In the 18th century, Richard Pococke described the monument as standing "about a furlong to the west" of what is now the Old City of Homs. The mausoleum was near the train station that exists now. The greater part of the necropolis of Emesa was made to disappear by 1952 in order to build the municipal stadium known today as Khalid ibn al-Walid Stadium, after excavations begun in August 1936 had uncovered a total of 22 tombs.

Owner

In the 16th century, Pierre Belon described a monument that was inscribed with the Greek letters of an epitaph of "Caius Cæſar" – which may have made it a cenotaph of Caius Julius Caesar Vipsanianus. It is however believed that Belon misread the inscription from this monument. Pietro Della Valle found in the inscription a ΓΑΙΩ ΙΟΥΛΙΩ, but not "Caesar"; later Pococke, who made the first summary drawing of the mausoleum, found that "on the eaſtern side the firſt word is ΓΑΙΟϹ". Louis-François Cassas' reproduction of an inscription bearing the name "CAIUS CÆSAR" on plate 23 of Voyage pittoresque de la Syrie, published 1799, is considered to have been a fantasy of the artist. In the 19th century, William Henry Waddington copied a Greek inscription said to have belonged to the monument and a copy of the latter by Dr. Skender Effendi (hereafter reproduced with the characters Ε, Ξ and Ω):

Carlos Chad has given the following translation of the inscription reconstituted by Waddington: "Caius Julius Sampsigéram, de la tribu Fabia, dit Seilas, fils de Caius Julius Alexion, a construit de son vivant ce tombeau, pour lui-même et les siens, l'an 390 [of the Seleucids]", id est in 78 or 79 CE.

The builder of the mausoleum may have been related to the Emesene dynasty through Gaius Julius Alexion. According to Maurice Sartre, the owner's Roman citizenship, attested by his tria nomina, strongly supports relatedness to the royal family. The lack of allusion to royal kinship is best explained if the dynasty had been deprived of its kingdom shortly before the mausoleum was built and the said kingdom had been annexed to the Roman province of Syria, which occurred very likely between 72 and the construction of the mausoleum. As worded by Kropp, "what the builder was really keen on stressing is that he was a Roman citizen bearing the tria nomina."

Architecture

Upon completion, the monument was about 25 meters high and, as worded by Kropp, "retained the basic formal characteristics of a traditional nefesh, i.e. a pyramidal stele, albeit on an immense scale", comparable with those of Kamouh el Hermel (in Lebanon) and the Tomb of Hamrath at Suwayda (also destroyed).

The outer walls and the roof were conceived in opus reticulatum, which is considered a rarity in the Orient, following a purely Roman construction technique using concrete which certainly necessitated the intervention of workers of Italian origin or having undergone a specific training. It was also unusual that opus reticulatum not be covered by stucco; according to Kropp, Sampsigeramus may have ordered to leave it visible as a statement that he was "on good terms with the rulers of the world, that is the Roman people and in particular with the Roman emperor".

Gallery

See also
 Emesa helmet – which was found in the same necropolis

References

Sources

External links
 Photographs from the Howard Crosby Butler Archive: Nos. 368 & 369

Buildings and structures completed in the 1st century
Buildings and structures in Homs
Buildings and structures demolished in 1911
Demolished buildings and structures in Syria